Time for a Change may refer to:

 Time for a Change (book), a 1993 book by Richard Bandler
 Time for a Change (album), a 2007 album by R&B artist Cupid

See also
Time for Change (disambiguation)